Aarhus Sports Park is a sports complex located in Aarhus, Denmark. The complex is named "Ceres Park & Arena" for sponsorship reasons, and contains various sports venues including the Aarhus Stadion and Ceres Arena. The complex is home to multiple sports teams from Aarhus, including Aarhus Gymnastikforening (AGF), Aarhus 1900, Aarhus Håndbold, Team Århus Floorball among others.

Sports venues
 Aarhus Stadium, home ground for Aarhus Gymnastikforening (AGF), currently known as Ceres Park
 Ceres Arena, home to the handball team Aarhus Håndbold, floorball team Team Århus Floorball 
 Aarhus Cyklebane (velodrome)
 Jutland Racecourse
 Aarhus 1900 Tennis

References

Sports venues in Denmark
Athletics (track and field) venues in Denmark
Buildings and structures in Aarhus